The Fixed Term Employees (Prevention of Less Favourable Treatment) Regulations 2002 (SI 2002/2034) are a UK statutory instrument aimed at protecting employees who have fixed-term contracts of employment. The regulations are in part intended to implement the European Union's Fixed-term Work Directive 1999 (99/70/EC) on fixed term workers.<ref name=en>UK Legislation Fixed Term Employees (Prevention of Less Favourable Treatment) Regulations 2002, SI 2002/2034, Explanatory Note</ref>

They came into effect on 1 October 2002.

Law
The principle of the Directive on which the Regulations are based is that a person with a fixed-term contract should not be treated less favourably than a comparable permanent co-worker.

Implementation
It is argued  that the Regulations fail adequately to implement the requirements of the directive, because they do not protect the full range of "workers" that the directive refers to. In UK labour law, the definitions of "worker" and "employee" are not the same (see s.230 Employment Rights Act 1996), and the concept of a "worker" is considered broader. But the Regulations are said to apply merely to the more limited category of "employees".

Also, r.2(2) provides that "an employee is not a comparable permanent employee if his employment has ceased". But in a decision by the European Court of Justice, Macarthy v. Smith [1980] ECR I-01275, it was held that a woman could compare herself for the purpose of Art. 119 of the EC Treaty (now Art. 141, the equal treatment provision on which the FTW Directive is based) with her predecessor in employment.

See also

UK labour lawAdeneler v Ellinikos Organismos Galaktos [2006] IRLR 716 (C-212/04) on objective justification for use of fixed-term contracts disclosing a genuine need, and measures employed are proportionate to that aim, and twenty days is too little to break continuityDel Cerro Alonso v Osakidetza'' (2007) C-307/05, [2008] ICR 145

Notes

References
 Aileen McColgan, 'The Fixed Term Employees (Prevention of Less Favourable Treatment) Regulations 2002: Fiddling While Rome Burns?' [2003] 32 ILJ 194

External links
Directive 99/70/EC on Fixed term workers
Implemented under Fixed Term Employees (Prevention of Less Favourable Treatment) Regulations 2002, SI 2002/2034
Directive 97/81/EC on Part-time workers
Implemented under Part-time Workers (Prevention of Less Favourable Treatment) Regulations 2000, SI 2000/1551
Proposed directive on Agency workers COD 2002/0149
Temporary and Agency Workers (Equal Treatment) Bill 2007, a proposal which has currently (13/3/2008) passed its second reading. The government has announced it wishes to find a common European solution.

United Kingdom labour law
Statutory Instruments of the United Kingdom
2002 in British law
2002 in labor relations